The following is a list of characters that first appeared in the New Zealand soap opera Shortland Street in 1993, by order of first appearance.

Rachel McKenna

Rachel McKenna was the spoilt teenage daughter of CEO - Michael (Paul Gittins) and Alex McKenna (Liddy Holloway). She arrived in early 1993 as part of the McKenna family unit and has been portrayed by Angela Bloomfield for numerous stints.

Leonard Dodds

Dr. Leonard Ralph Carlton Rossi-Dodds was the love interest and eventual husband to Gina Rossi (Josephine Davison). He arrived as the eccentric new doctor in early 1993 and soon started to date the equally eccentric - Gina. However Leonard soon left and when he returned, was shocked Gina had moved on to Hone Ropata (Temuera Morrison). The two reconciled and were married, something Leonard's best man - Lionel Skeggins (John Leigh) nearly put an end to. The couple bought a houseboat and after Leonard recovered from his sea sickness, the two tried for children. The attempts proved useless and the two moved to America. They returned later in the year as best man and bridesmaid to Lionel and Kirsty (Angela Dotchin) and left in early 1995. In late 1995 it was announced Gina had given birth to a boy named Leonardo.

The character has been named as iconic.

Alex McKenna

Alexandra "Alex" McKenna (previously King) was the wife of Michael McKenna (Paul Gittins) who was portrayed by Liddy Holloway from 1993 until 1995 and again for a guest roles in 1996 and 2002. Liddy Holloway, who had previously been a writer for the show, was cast as the matriarch of the new family unit, the McKennas. Paul Gittins who portrayed Alex's husband, Michael, would jokingly accuse Holloway of giving her character the best lines of the two.

Alex arrived in early 1993 and instantly got under the skin of estranged husband - Michael McKenna (Paul Gittins). Alex had a brief fling with 16-year-old Stuart Neilson (Martin Henderson) but fell back in love with Michael and the two renewed their vows. She purchased "Kennedys" bar and whilst managing it, had a brief affair with Greg Feeney (Tim Balme). Sensing Michael was also having an affair, Alex had plastic surgery and as a result of a forged prescription, fell into a coma. Michael was accused of trying to murder his wife but their daughter - Rachel (Angela Bloomfield) unveiled the truth. The couple went on holiday but Alex suffered a nervous breakdown and upon their return, the two left Ferndale for the country side. However Alex returned the following year and announced the marriage was over. She continued to run the bar and took up with the much younger - Cameron Scott (Glen Drake). However they broke up and Alex gave the bar to Rachel so that she could attempt a reconciliation with Michael.

Two years later, Michael reported to Rachel that Alex had died whilst overseas from illness. In 2002 Rachel was shocked when Alex returned to her life and revealed she had faked her death in a ploy to escape her family. However it soon turned out Alex wanted Rachel's boyfriend - Chris' (Michael Galvin) money to create a new identity and she was sent packing. In both 2009 and 2011 it was stated that Alex had died.

Laurie Brasch

Laurie Brasch appeared in guest and recurring roles for 3 year played by Chic Littlewood. Laurie was the policeman investigating the disappearance of Marj Neilson's (Elizabeth McRae) husband - Tom (Adrian Keeling) from his inner city home. Comforting the distraught Marj after she realised her bank accounts had been emptied, the two fell in love. However Tom returned and Marj's son Darryl (Mark Ferguson) tried to scare Laurie off. Tom had a fatal heart attack, with his will preventing any money to be given if Marj was unfaithful. She broke it off with Laurie and fell into a grief-ridden state. Nick Harrison (Karl Burnett) realised Marj was lonely and surprised her by organising a reconciliation with Laurie on New Years Eve. The two moved to Laurie's family farm which lead to Marj suffering from accidental poisoning from weed killer. The resulting worry pushed Laurie to propose to Marj but he was devastatingly diagnosed with a brain tumour. The two followed through with an engagement following Laurie's recovery but Marj struggled to comprehend Laurie's Jewish faith to her strong Catholic beliefs and the opposition of his daughter Ruth (Joanna Briant). Ultimately the two wed in a ceremony combining both traditions. In 1995 Marj and Laurie fostered a daughter, Lulu (Meighan Desmond) after she was abused by her father. Laurie retired from the police force and took up security work at the clinic. He was stood down when a young homeless boy, Fergus (Paul Ellis) was seriously injured under his watch though he was cleared when Emily Devine (Michaela Rooney) confessed. In December a truck crashed through the clinic and Laurie helped the survivors but suffered a huge panic attack, leading to the end of his career. In 1996 Laurie departed with Marj to move closer to her job in Wellington.

Amanda Warner

Amanda Warner was the disabled twin sister of Chris Warner (Michael Galvin). The Warner's had grown up believing Amanda had died at birth however Guy (Craig Parker) discovered in 1993 that Bruce Warner (Ken Blackburn) had covered up her birth in fear of the shame she would bring to the family. Chris initially struggled to accept his sister but within weeks, found her a place at the hospital to stay. However it was clear she needed full-time nursing and was sent overseas.

Amanda returned in 2005 when her carer - Liam Todd (Campbell Cooley) kidnapped her from her hospital and took her to Chris and his wife Toni (Laura Hill) in an attempt to show them she was more than a vegetable. Chris soon became convinced when Amanda touched him but Toni believed Liam had more sinister plans and the two discovered Liam had spent time in a psychiatric ward. Chris and Toni eventually decided to have Amanda put into a local home but surprised all by allowing Liam visiting rights. In 2007 Guy, Chris, Toni, Harry (Henry Williams) and Tuesday (Olivia Tennet) visited Amanda and took her for a picnic.

Jamie Forrest

Jamie Forrest was the show's first openly gay character and eventual boyfriend of Jonathon McKenna (Kieren Hutchison).

Jo Jordan

Joanna Jordan was the ignorant young nurse who was portrayed by Greer Robson from 1993 to 1994. At first Jo had her sights set on Steve (Andrew Binns) but the two became best friends instead and Jo was molested by Paul (Simon Prast). Jo grew close to Stuart Neilson (Martin Henderson) after her brother was in a car crash and the two dated. They broke up following the car crash that killed Steve but again got back together. Paul returned and successfully harassed Jo to drop her charges against him. She eventually broke up with Stuart and fled town with new boyfriend - Greg Feeney (Tim Balme).

Declan Kennedy

Declan Kennedy was the dodgy father of Steve Mills (Andrew Binns). He arrived in mid-1993 and quickly caught the attention of Jenny Harrison (Maggie Harper), who he trained at the gym. Steve was reluctant to the newcomer and the staff soon realised Declan was Steves father. Steve blamed Declan for the suicide of his mother but the two eventually patched things up. Jenny was upset when Declan chose Carrie (Lisa Crittenden) over her and Declan married Carrie in Las Vegas. Upon their return, the two purchased the local bar and Declan started to run it. When Carrie gave birth to her three children, Declan offered little support and started to appear withdrawn. It soon turned out he had attempted a bank robbery but it had gone terribly wrong. He realized his life was in danger and fled New Zealand, leaving Carrie in the wake of his dangerous associates.

Carmen Roberts

Carmen Roberts first appeared in a guest stint in mid-1993 before returning several months later as a core character. Carmen arrived as a new nurse but when her addiction to prescription pills came to light, she was fired. She returned months later completely rehabilitated but director of nursing - Paul Churchill (Simon Prast) revealed she was formerly a prostitute and was at odds with the clinics staff. When Carmen innocently claimed a dead patients lottery ticket, she discovered she had won thousands of dollars and guiltily spent a lot of it before she started to date Guy Warner (Craig Parker). Carmen discovered she was pregnant and in October gave birth to Tuesday Warner (Kelly Tate) amidst a massive storm. In December a truck ploughed through the clinic reception and Carmen received what appeared to be minor bruising. However, later Carmen collapsed and died, having developed a brain hemorrhage.

Carmen was very popular amongst the public and was openly mourned upon her death. In 2012, Carmen's death was voted by fans as one of the show's most iconic moments.

Te Aniwa Ryan

Dr. Te Aniwa Ryan first appeared in mid-1993. She was up against Hone Ropata (Temuera Morrison) in a televised debate and it was clear they had largely differing opinions. Hone began to get stalked but it turned out to be Te Aniwa, desperate to express her love. The two began a relationship though it was on the rocks when Hone encouraged Te Aniwa's brother to continue boxing. The two broke up when Te Aniwa discovered Hone had cheated on her with Hilary Sturgess (Susan Brady).

Shane Raskin

Shane Raskin was the businessman boyfriend of Kirsty Knight (Angela Dotchin). The two dated for several months before Kirsty broke up with Shane over the new year.

Nat Aleni

Nat Aleni was the gang affiliated teenage brother of Sam Aleni (Rene Naufahu). Sam did not realize until it was too late how serious the problem between Tongan and Samoan gangs were and Nat became involved in gang life. Nat's best friend Willy was murdered by the Tongan gangs and Nat promised to end his affiliations. Nat helped Jamie Forrest (Karl Urban) in his attempt to bring together Sam and T.P (Elizabth Skeen) and later attended their wedding. Nat later spoke at T.P's funeral and consoled his brother.

TP Aleni

Talita "TP" Aleni (née Palele) was the Tongan wife of Sam Aleni (Rene Naufahu). TP originally wanted nothing to do with Sam when his brother - Nat (Joe Naufahu) fought with her brother in gang-wars. However, with the help of Jamie Forrest (Karl Urban), the two realized they had fallen in love and without their families approval, married. The two struggled with married life but stayed in love nonetheless. However TP was shocked to learn Sam had dated a drug addict. Unfortunately for the couple, TP was involved in a car accident in early 1994 and tragically died in the subsequent explosion. 20 years to the date of TP's death, Sam emotionally broke down to Ula Levi (Frankie Adams), explaining the impact TP's death had on his life and the subsequent loss of his second wife.

Paul Churchill

Paul Churchill was the villainous director of nursing who covered for Carrie Burton (Lisa Crittenden) whilst she was on leave. He recognized Carmen Roberts (Theresa Healey) as a prostitute and reported her. He started to harass both Jo (Greer Robson) and Jaki (Nancy Brunning), eventually molesting Jo. Carmen reported Paul and had him fired. Nonetheless Paul returned the following year and harassed Jo into dropping her allegation. He found a job at the hospital, but Carmen realized he was the man behind several severe beatings of women and had him arrested. In 1995, Paul escaped prison and attempted to kill both Carmen and Guy (Craig Parker) by setting their houseboat out to sea. He failed and was arrested.

Frank Connelly

Frank Warner (previously Burton and Connelly) was one of Carrie Burton's triplets born during Meredith's leaving party on the 11 October 1993. He moved alongside Carrie, and his siblings Finbar and Sarah to Australia when he was a few months old. His father Chris Warner visited him in November 1995. He returned to the show in December 2016. Frank would depart in 2018, but return at the end of 2019.

Finn Connelly

Finn Warner (previously Burton and Connelly) was born on-screen alongside his triplet siblings, Frank and Sass in 1993. He returned in 2016 with Lukas Whiting in the role.

Sass Connelly

Katherine Blake

Dr. Katherine Blake (formerly named Wendy Mulligan) was the psychotic girlfriend of Chris Warner (Michael Galvin). She arrived as the replacement for Meredith Fleming (Stephanie Wilkin) and quickly got on Chris' good side. However, when she failed to save the life of Tom Neilson (Adrian Keeling), she made an enemy of Darryl Neilson (Mark Ferguson) and showed her true colours when she overpowered and threatened him when he dove into her private life. Katherine started to date Chris but some started to see her true self when a British patient named Nora recognized her from a news article in England and Katherine attempted to murder her whilst a young patient - Sarah-Jane (Lauren Porteous Morcom) watched. Kirsty (Angela Dotchin) began to research Katherine's past and found herself framed for robbery. She eventually discovered Katherine was really named Wendy, had murdered her husband and was not really a doctor. A desperate Katherine attempted to flee the country but when confronted by Chris, attempted to murder him. Katherine was arrested and upon release from bail, announced to Chris that one day she would become a doctor before leaving.

Jonathon McKenna

Dr. Jonathon Alexander McKenna was the homosexual brother of Rachel McKenna (Angela Bloomfield). The character's gay storyline broke ground with Kieren Hutchison reprising the role for numerous stints throughout the series.

Kim Furious 

Kim Furious'' was a rock star who went into Shortland Street for minor surgery. Nick had a crush on her, and when he heard she was at the clinic, snuck into her room a few times to try to meet her. The two became friends, and Kim would eventually give Nick a kiss before she departed.

Lionel SkegginsLionel Skeggins was the eccentric friend of Leonard Dodds (Marton Csokas). He arrived in a guest role for Leonard's wedding in 1993 and returned in a regular role the following year. He stayed on the show for 5 years and since his departure has become iconic and a fan favourite.

Patrick NeilsonPatrick Neilson was the second eldest son of Marj Neilson (Elizabeth McRae) and Tom Neilson (Adrian Keeling). He made a single guest appearance, portrayed by an uncredited actor for his father's funeral in November 1993.

Jean-Luc MafartJean-Luc Mafart was the French husband of Alison Raynor (Danielle Cormack). The two married following Alison's departure from Shortland Street however it was not long before Alison had returned to Ferndale with the claim her husband was an international terrorist and was abusive. Jean-Luc himself showed up in town and was quick to suss out the locals in his search for Alison. Steve (Andrew Binns) was shocked when he discovered Jean-Luc had broken into his house and Hone (Temuera Morrison) was forced to pretend he dyed his hair black to explain Alison's hair dye that Jean-Luc discovered. Jean-Luc eventually found Alison and followed her to her parents farm. The two had a showdown on the barn roof and Jean-Luc slipped and fell to his death. Alison and Darryl (Mark Ferguson) covered up the crime before Alison fled New Zealand.

Adam BradyAdam Brady was the mentally disturbed possible son of Jenny Harrison (Maggie Harper). Nick (Karl Burnett) began to get annoyed when Adam followed him home after school and Jenny eventually confronted Adam on Christmas. It soon turned out Adam believed he had been swapped with Nick when the two were newborns in hospital. Jenny started to get to know Adam, something which annoyed Nick and made him question his identity. Jenny brought Adam's concerns to his mother who revealed Adam was a sufferer of schizophrenia. Jenny attempted to cut ties with Adam to spend time with Nick and Adam failed to cope, losing his mind completely. He was institutionalized in early 1994.

Benjamin MarshallDr. Benjamin Marshall''' was a long running extra who was for several years, one of the show's longest running characters. Benjamin appeared in several notable scenes including the 1996 earthquake, Michael McKenna's (Paul Gittins) wake and Kirsty Knight's (Angela Dotchin) final scene. The character received a cult following and received lines after being requested by fans.

References

1993
, Shortland Street